Margrave (markgraf) was a medieval title, equivalent of marquis (marquess)

Margrave may also refer to:

 Margrave (American horse), an American horse that won the Preakness Stakes in 1896
 Margrave (British horse), a British horse than won the St Leger Stakes in 1832
 Margrave, a fictional town in Georgia that is the setting of the TV show Reacher

See also

 
 
 
 Markgraf (disambiguation)
 Marquess (disambiguation)
 Marquis (disambiguation)